Leslie George Everard Jones (17 February 1907 – 20 November 1982) was an Australian rules footballer who played with North Melbourne in the Victorian Football League (VFL).

Family
The son of George Alfred Jones (1880-1968), and Violet Ivy Eula Jones (1886-1948), née McKee, Leslie George Everard Jones was born at Queenscliff, Victoria on 17 February 1907.

Death
He died at Hampton, Victoria on 20 November 1982.

Notes

References

External links 

1907 births
1982 deaths
Australian rules footballers from Victoria (Australia)
North Melbourne Football Club players